Free Me is the second studio album by English singer Emma Bunton, released on 9 February 2004 by 19 Recordings. The album peaked at number seven on the UK Albums Chart and spawned three top-10 singles: "Free Me", "Maybe" and "I'll Be There". With this album, Bunton became the only former Spice Girl to have sold more copies of her second album than her first.

Background
In 2001, Bunton released her solo debut album A Girl Like Me through Virgin Records. It spent over 12 weeks inside the UK Albums Chart, peaking at number four and earning a gold certification by the British Phonographic Industry (BPI). It also produced her only solo chart-topper "What Took You So Long?", as well as the top-five singles "What I Am" and "Take My Breath Away", and the top-20 entry "We're Not Gonna Sleep Tonight". When it came to her second album, her record company "came to me and said, 'Let's do a demo thing for the second album.' And I thought, 'Hold on a minute.' Not a lot of people know this, but I actually walked away from it. We put so much into it, and when they don't give you that support anymore, it's quite heartbreaking", says Bunton. "I said, 'Thank you very much for the demo idea, but I want to take this where I know people are going to be right behind me and work as hard as I do.'"

Composition
The album was inspired by 1960s sounds, such as bossa nova, Motown and French pop. The album was largely produced by Mike Peden and Yak Bondy, who have produced tracks for acts such as S Club 7 and Lucie Silvas. Other contributions on the album are courtesy of Cathy Dennis, Henry Binns, and Puerto Rican singer Luis Fonsi. The album was released via 19 Recordings, which is a division of 19 Management, the company owned by Simon Fuller. Bunton says of the inspiration behind the album: "I've been listening to Motown since I was about five, and just loving it, being very passionate about the fact how it was all done live, and I thought, 'Hold on, I always talk about the fact I love '60s and Motown', so I thought I'd take elements of it, bits of it, and put it into my album, so that's exactly what I did." However, Bunton's songs on this album mainly started life as a simple scribble. She says, "I have a little book beside my bed, where I put all my ideas for songs and stuff. It's kind of weird, 'cuz usually when I'm having a dream, I'll wake up, and I'll write something down, then I'll look at it again and think, 'God, what was I dreaming about?'"

Singles
The album's lead single, "Free Me", was released in May 2003. The song immediately picked up airplay, peaking at number five on the UK Singles Chart.

"Maybe" was released as the second single in October 2003, and also gained extensive airplay throughout the United Kingdom, peaking at number six.

In January 2004, "I'll Be There" was released as the third single from the album. Like its two predecessors, it performed well on the charts, peaking at number seven on the UK chart.

Later in the year, in May, "Crickets Sing for Anamaria", was released as the fourth single. The song peaked at number 15 on the UK Singles Chart.

In the United States, both "Free Me" and "Maybe" were dance club regulars, reaching numbers four and six on the Billboard Hot Dance Club Play chart, respectively.

Critical reception

The album was acclaimed by critics for its catchy and fun use of sounds from the Motown and the 1960s era. BBC Music says the album is "light and frothy, like a good cappuccino, but this time it's with the sugar taken out". Stephen Thomas Erlewine of AllMusic gave a positive review saying, "This music is stylish without being flashy, thanks in large part to the charmingly tuneful, sturdy songs (all but one bearing a writing credit from Emma). While Bunton may still have a small, sweet voice, she's developed a stronger presence on record, giving this album not just a face, but a fetching persona that's hard to resist".

According to Lynsey Hanley from newspaper The Daily Telegraph, Bunton's new musical direction was "a brave move, given that high-sheen, saucy R&B is currently the main mode of expression for female pop performers, but Emma's lilting vocals and only faintly suggestive image suit this album's less aggressive style".

"The album's got charm, grace and it's fun", said Q magazine. Marie Claire magazine said it "mixes up bossa nova with James Bond soundtrack" and that "Emma resembles a seductive Brigitte Bardot".

Track listing

Notes
  signifies an additional producer
  signifies a remixer

Personnel
Credits adapted from the liner notes of Free Me.

Musicians

 Emma Bunton – lead vocals ; backing vocals 
 Charlie Russell – programming ; live drums ; drums, live programming 
 Mike Peden – bass ; percussion ; keyboards 
 Graham Kearns – guitars ; bass guitar 
 Helene Muddiman – keyboards ; backing vocals 
 Martin Hayles – keyboards 
 Nick Ingman – orchestra arrangement, orchestra conducting 
 Gavyn Wright – orchestra leader 
 Paul Turner – bass ; guitar 
 Pete Gordeno – keyboards ; piano 
 Yak Bondy – keyboards 
 Ralph Salmins – drums 
 Frank Ricotti – percussion ; vibes 
 Paul Clarvis – percussion 
 Steve Pearce – bass 
 Hugh Burns – guitar 
 John Parricelli – guitar 
 Friðrik Karlsson – guitar 
 Richard Studt – orchestra leader 
 Allan Simpson – guitar 
 Pete Trotman – bass guitar 
 Simon Clarke – flute 
 Siemy Di – percussion 
 Alastair Gavin – string arrangement 
 Danny Cummings – percussion 
 Phil Todd – flute 
 Simon Ellis – all keyboards, programming 
 Paul Gendler – guitar 
 John Thompson – bass guitar 
 Brett Morgan – drums 
 Lisa Daniels – backing vocals 
 Ray "Madman" Hedges – arrangement 
 Nigel Butler – arrangement 
 Fabien Waltmann – programming, guitars 
 Nicky Brown – piano, Rhodes 
 Cathy Dennis – backing vocals 
 Luis Fonsi – vocals 
 Henrik Linnemann – flute 
 Tim Lever – all other instruments 
 Mike Percy – all other instruments 
 Toni Leo – backing vocals 
 Alex Clarke – additional programming 
 Steve Lewinson – all instruments (except piano and additional guitar), programming 
 Pete Lewinson – all instruments (except piano and additional guitar), programming 
 Paul "Harry" Harris – piano 
 Ian Lewinson – additional guitar 
 London Session Orchestra – orchestra 
 Simon Hale – orchestra arrangement, orchestra conducting

Technical

 Mike Peden – production ; mixing 
 Mark "Spike" Stent – mixing 
 Martin Hayles – recording ; engineering 
 Isobel Griffiths Ltd. – orchestra contractor 
 Richard Dowling – mastering
 Yak Bondy – production 
 Dan Frampton – mixing 
 Steve Price – recording engineering 
 César Gimeno – engineering assistance 
 Boo Dan Productions – production, mixing 
 Simon Ellis – production 
 Tony Taverner – engineering 
 Jim Brumby – Pro Tools 
 Ray "Madman" Hedges – production, mixing 
 Nigel Butler – mixing 
 Mark Emmitt – mixing 
 Cathy Dennis – production 
 Fabien Waltmann – production, additional recording 
 Steve Fitzmaurice – mixing 
 Richard Wilkinson – mixing assistance 
 Keith Uddin – recording 
 Phil Bodger – mixing 
 Tim Lever – production 
 Mike Percy – production 
 Dan Panton – engineering assistance 
 Steve Lewinson – production 
 Pete Lewinson – production 
 Lipso Facto – additional production 
 The Asian Sensation – mixing

Artwork
 Yacht Associates – art direction
 Darren S. Feist – photography
 Roger Dean – architectural photography
 Core Digital – scanning, retouching

Charts

Weekly charts

Year-end charts

Certifications and sales

Release history

Notes

References

19 Recordings albums
2004 albums
Albums produced by Mike Peden
Albums recorded at Olympic Sound Studios
Emma Bunton albums